Wadąg  is a settlement in the administrative district of Gmina Dywity, within Olsztyn County, Warmian-Masurian Voivodeship, in northern Poland. It lies on the river Wadąg, close to the city of Olsztyn.

References

Villages in Olsztyn County